Rhopalostylidinae is a botanical subtribe consisting of two genera of palms from Australia and New Zealand, Hedyscepe and Rhopalostylis. These two genera were formerly included in Archontophoenicinae, to which they are morphologically similar (Dowe 2010:233), until a recent revision (Dransfield, Uhl et al., 2005).

Description
The palms in this subtribe are medium-sized palms, with well-developed, distinct crownshafts and strictly pinnate leaves with generally short and massive petioles. The inflorescences are branched to two or three orders, with the prophyll and penduncular bracts similar (Uhl and Dransfield 1987:367).

Genera

References

 
 
 
 

 
Plant subtribes